The Ajax was a French automobile built by the American Briscoe brothers, Benjamin and Frank, between 1913 and 1919.  Originally built in Neuilly, it was a 12hp cyclecar with 980 cc 4-cylinder engine with friction drive.  It sold for £78.

Production continued after the brothers returned to the United States where they built the Argo car, which was similar to the Ajax, differing in the inclusion of a more conventional transmission.

See also 
 La page retraçant la carrière des frères Briscoe sur le cimetière des marques (in French)

Cyclecars
Cars introduced in 1913
Defunct motor vehicle manufacturers of France
Vintage vehicles